Tollygunge Agragami Football Club is an Indian professional football club based in Tollygunge, Kolkata, West Bengal. Founded in 1943, the club primarily competes in the Calcutta Premier Division League. It previously participated in the National Football League, then top flight of Indian football league system, alongside I-League 2nd Division. Beside CFL, the club participates in other regional tournaments alongside the Kolkata giants ATK Mohun Bagan, East Bengal and Mohammedan Sporting.

History

Early history

Tollygunge Agragami, as a football club, founded in Kolkata, India, during the British raj. The team was incorporated in 1943 as Russa Agragami Samity. It was later renamed to "Tollygunge Agragami" in 1955. The club uses Rabindra Sarobar Stadium as its home ground, which has a capacity of 22,000. Although the team has not been as successful as their city rivals, East Bengal Club, Mohun Bagan AC, alongside Mohammedan Sporting, but they are a team to watch out for.

The club in 1971, reached the final of prestigious IFA Shield, but was defeated by Mohamedan Sporting 2–0. The team was then managed by legendary coach Sushil Bhattacharya, who guided them earning promotion to Calcutta Football League first division. Winning the 1997–98 season of the National Football League 2nd Division, is Tollygunge's biggest achievement since their inception. Nepali international Hari Khadka donned in the club colours in 1996–97 season.

In July 2000, after a brilliant display at the NFL, Tollygunge goalkeeper Prasanta Dora was included in Sukhwinder Singh managed national team of India during their historic England-tour, where they played three matches against English Premier League sides Fulham, West Bromwich Albion, and arch-rival Bangladesh.

Present years
Tollygunge Agragami participated in the 2018 Calcutta Premier Division playoffs, finishing tenth. They were relegated to the Calcutta Premier Division B and defeated Mohammedan Sporting by 2–1. They won two matches, drew two, and lost the rest. They did not qualify for Calcutta Premier Division A in 2019 and 2020.

In 2021, Tollygunge announced Modern Institute of Engineering and Technology as their main sponsor ahead of the 2021–22 Calcutta Premier Division.

National Football League seasons
In 1998, Tollygunge Agragami emerged as one of the finest sides from Kolkata to participate in the inaugural National Football League, then top tier Indian football league system. They finished as 4th in the Group A of the 1998–99 National Football League with 14 points.

In the 1999–2000 National Football League, they again competed with the top clubs and finished as 8th with 26 points, behind Kingfisher East Bengal.

In the fifth season of the National Football League, the club competed bravely, finishing 8th again with 24 points.

Tollygunge enjoyed their back to back appearances in the top flight league in which they finished 9th in the 2001–02 National Football League (sixth season) with 23 points.

In the 2002–03 National Football League, they again finished 9th with 23 points.

The 2003–04 National Football League was tough for them, where they finished 10th behind the giants Mohun Bagan A.C. with only 20 points.

In 2004–05 National Football League, Tollygunge relegated after finishing at the bottom with 17 points. They lost 11 games and won only 3, as East Bengal FC and Vasco SC thrashed Tollygunge by 5–0 respectively and Mohun Bagan rout them by 4–0.

Sponsorship history
In 2014, the club entered into a sponsorship of Shree Venkatesh Films, and registered by the name of "Tollygunge Agragami SVF Football Club Private Limited".

In 2015, the club acquired service of Trak-Only as their main shirt sponsor.

Home grounds

The club plays its home matches at the Rabindra Sarobar Stadium which is located in Lake Gardens, Kolkata.

22,000 seater Kishore Bharati Krirangan, located in Jadavpur, was used as the home ground of Tollygunge Agragami for both the National Football League and Calcutta Football League for a long time.

Rivalry
Tollygunge has the rivalries with other two Calcutta Football League sides Kalighat Milan Sangha and Bhawanipore FC, which is often referred to as the "South Kolkata Derby".

South Kolkata Derby

Managerial history

 Sushil Bhattacharya (1970–1972)
 Amal Dutta (1999–2000)
 Shankar Mitra (2000–2001)
 Aloke Mukherjee (2001–2002)
 Chandu Roy Chowdhury (2002)
 Amal Dutta (2002–2003)
 Subrata Bhattacharya (2003)
 Krishnendu Roy (2003–2004, 2005)
 Mridul Banerjee (2011–2013)
 Ranjan Chaudhuri (2015–2016)
 Monoranjan Bhattacharya (2018)
 Bimal Ghosh (2018–2019)

Notable players
For all current and former notable Tollygunge Agragami players with a Wikipedia article, see: :Category:Tollygunge Agragami FC players.

World Cup players

  Anthony Wolfe (2017)

Honours

League
 National Football League II
Champions (1): 1997–98
Calcutta Football League
Third place (7): 1997–98, 1998–99, 1999–00, 2001, 2002, 2003, 2014–15

Cup
 IFA Shield 
Runners-up (2): 1971, 1999
All Airlines Gold Cup
Runners-up (3): 1998, 2000, 2002
 McDowell's Cup
Champions (1): 1999
 Libero One-Day Cup
Champions (1): 2003

Other department

Men's cricket
Tollygunge Agragami is having its men's cricket section. It is under the state jurisdiction of Cricket Association of Bengal (CAB), which is governing body of cricket in West Bengal, and competes in CAB First Division League, J.C. Mukherjee T-20 Trophy and other tournaments.

See also

 Football in Kolkata
 List of football clubs in Kolkata
 List of football clubs in India

Notes

References

Further reading

External links
Tollygunge Agragami FC at Soccerway
Tollygunge Agragami FC archives at arunfoot.com (Arunava about football)
Team info at Global Sports Archive

Tollygunge Agragami at WorldFootball.net

Association football clubs established in 1943
Sports clubs in India
1943 establishments in India
Football clubs in Kolkata
Tollygunge Agragami FC